Neurosigma is a monotypic butterfly genus in the family Nymphalidae. Its only species, Neurosigma siva, the panther or leopard, is found in Asia.

References

Limenitidinae
Fauna of Pakistan
Monotypic butterfly genera
Nymphalidae genera